The 2014 NHL Heritage Classic was an outdoor regular season National Hockey League (NHL) game held indoor, part of the Heritage Classic series of outdoor NHL ice hockey games in Canada. It took place on March 2, 2014, in BC Place in Vancouver, with the Ottawa Senators facing off against the home team Canucks. It is the first "outdoor" game to be played in what technically is an indoor stadium, albeit one of a larger capacity than a typical NHL arena; BC Place is a retractable roof venue, and it is unknown if the stadium has the capabilities to keep its roof open during inclement weather (several stadiums of the type explicitly cannot be kept open in such an environment due to drainage concerns). The game was televised nationally in Canada on CBC and nationally in the United States on NBCSN.

It was announced hours before the game that the roof of BC Place would be closed for the duration of the game due to weather concerns.

The 2014 NHL Heritage Classic was also the last game to feature Roberto Luongo as a player for Vancouver.

Game summary 

The Canucks built a 2–0 lead in the first period with goals by Jason Garrison and Zack Kassian. The Senators then scored four unanswered goals by Clarke MacArthur, Erik Karlsson, Cody Ceci, and Colin Greening to win the game. The loss left Vancouver head coach John Tortorella answering questions during the post game press conference about why he started Eddie Lack in goal instead of regular starter Roberto Luongo. Tortorella's decision was also unpopular with the crowd during the game as they booed Lack, while Luongo was also unhappy as he had been looking forward to that game all season. Two days later on March 4, a day before the NHL trade deadline, Luongo was traded to the Florida Panthers.

Number in parenthesis represents the player's total in goals or assists to that point of the season

Team rosters

Scratches
Ottawa Senators: Jared Cowen, Matt Kassian, Joe Corvo
Vancouver Canucks: Yannick Weber, Jordan Schroeder

Officials 
 Referees — Steve Kozari, Tom Kowal
 Linesmen — Brad Lazarowich, Michel Cormier

See also
2014 NHL Stadium Series

References

Heritage Classic
2014
Ottawa Senators games
Vancouver Canucks games
Ice hockey competitions in Vancouver
2010s in Vancouver
Heritage Classic